House IV: The Repossession (also known simply as House IV), is a 1992 direct-to-video comedy horror film directed by Lewis Abernathy, from a script co-written by Geoff Miller and Deidre Higgins. Produced by Sean S. Cunningham and Debbie Hayn-Cass, it serves as the fourth and final installment in the House film series. Starring Terri Treas, Melissa Clayton, and Scott Burkholder, the film also featured William Katt reprising his role as Roger Cobb from the first movie. While it has connections to the original, it is a mostly-standalone sequel, with a plot centered around another home that encounters a haunting.

Synopsis
Roger Cobb (William Katt) is now married to Kelly (Terri Treas), has a daughter, Laurel (Melissa Clayton), and often visits the old Cobb family house after his father has died and is located on a deserted and desolate shoreline. Roger's cynical step-brother Burke (Scott Burkholder) has been pestering him to sell the family mansion, edging Roger to break his oath with their father. Roger is soon killed in a bad car accident that leaves Laurel requiring a wheelchair, leaving the house over to Kelly. Burke is still unable to convince Kelly to sell the house. Unknown to Kelly, Burke wants to sell the house so that a seedy Mafia group can use the property to dump illegal waste. The head of the Mafia group suffers from dwarfism and suffers intense phlegm, but proves to be very powerful and influential.

Various supernatural events start occurring in the house, and after Kelly consults with a Native American spiritual guide, she learns that it is the spirits of Roger and some Native Americans, trying to warn Kelly about the danger she is in.

Reception

Andrew Pollard at Starburst called it a "a fitting way to bring the House franchise to a conclusion". AllMovie wrote, "this installment marks a slightly more effective return to the horror comedy formula that made the original a surprise hit".

References

External links
 

1992 films
1992 horror films
American comedy horror films
American haunted house films
American supernatural horror films
Direct-to-video horror films
Films scored by Harry Manfredini
New Line Cinema films
1990s comedy horror films
1992 comedy films
1990s English-language films
1990s American films
House (film series)